Dhodha is a festival in Navratri dedicated to the worship of Hindu saurastra deity Shakti. The word dhodha is song. the is savrastrian trik or tretli. During these nine nights and ten days, nine forms of Shakti/Devi are worshipped. The 10th day is commonly referred to as Vijayadashami or "Dussehra."

References 

Hindu festivals
Religious festivals in India
Hindu festivals in Nepal